The New Town Rivulet (commonly known as Newtown Creek) is a permanently flowing creek in Hobart, Tasmania, that has as its headwaters the springs and snow water run-offs of Mount Wellington.

Location
The New Town Rivulet flows from its headwaters though the Hobart suburbs of Lenah Valley and New Town to New Town Bay in the River Derwent.

Headwaters
The rivulet is fed by a number of underground springs in the Wellington Range.

References

Rivers of Hobart